Viktor Borisovich Astapov (born 9 December 1962) is an officer of the Russian Armed Forces. He currently holds the rank of Lieutenant General, and since 2019 has served as a deputy commander in chief of the Russian Navy.

Astapov entered the military after studying at the Ryazan Guards Higher Airborne Command School, serving in a regimental reconnaissance company of the Soviet Airborne Forces. Rising through the ranks he saw service during the First Nagorno-Karabakh War, subsequently becoming commander of a paratrooper battalion after the breakup of the Soviet Union. By the mid-2000s he was commander of the 7th Guards Mountain Air Assault Division, and after studies at the Military Academy of the General Staff of the Armed Forces, became chief of staff and first deputy commander of the Siberian Military District.

Astapov went on to serve in senior staff positions in the Southern and Western Military Districts, rising to the rank of lieutenant-general, before becoming a deputy commander of the navy, with responsibility for the coastal troops. Over his career he has received a number of awards, including the Order of Courage, the Order "For Service to the Homeland in the Armed Forces of the USSR" Third Class, and the Order of Military Merit.

Early life and service
Astapov was born on 9 December 1962 in Tikhoretsk, Krasnodar Krai, then part of the Russian SFSR, in the USSR. Inspired by the 1971 film Officers, Astapov decided on a career in the military, and settled on the Soviet Airborne Forces. After failing to gain entry to the Ryazan Guards Higher Airborne Command School on his first attempt, Astapov spent a year studying physics at Rostov State University, before succeeding in applying to the Ryazan Airborne School. He graduated in 1985 and went to serve in a regimental reconnaissance company of the Soviet Airborne Forces based in Tula. The following year he was appointed commander of the company, and went with them to Baku, where he was posted during the First Nagorno-Karabakh War. He subsequently received the Order "For Service to the Homeland in the Armed Forces of the USSR" Third Class for his service in policing the rising tensions. On his return to Russia he was appointed chief of staff of a paratrooper battalion of the 106th Guards Airborne Division, becoming its commander two and a half years later.

Commands and Chechen operations

Astapov then carried out studies at the Frunze Military Academy, graduating in 1996 and becoming deputy commander of the 21st Airborne Brigade, which was seconded to Chechnya during the First and Second Chechen Wars. Despite continuing attacks on withdrawing Russian forces, Astapov brought off the withdrawal with minimal losses, and was awarded the Order of Courage, and the Medal "For Distinction in Military Service", first and second classes. He then became commander of the 7th Guards Mountain Air Assault Division between 2005 and 2007. He graduated from the Military Academy of the General Staff of the Armed Forces in 2009, and was then appointed to the post of chief of staff and first deputy commander of the Siberian Military District.

Senior staff appointments
From January 2011 Astapov served as chief of staff and deputy commander of the 49th Combined Arms Army of the Southern Military District, and in May 2012 became commander of the 49th Combined Arms Army. As army commander he was also head of the Stavropol Territorial Garrison. From December 2013 to April 2014 he was deputy commander of the Southern Military District, being promoted from general-major to general-lieutenant on 24 February 2014.  On 21 June 2014 he was appointed chief of staff and first deputy commander of the Western Military District. As chief of staff of the Western Military District, Astapov was heavily involved in planning and carrying out the Zapad 2017 exercises. On 1 August 2018, while serving as acting commander of the Western Military District, Astapov met with a Japanese military delegation in Saint Petersburg, led by Defence Minister Itsunori Onodera. 

In February 2019 Astapov was moved from the position of chief of staff of the Western Military District to the post of a deputy commander of the navy, with responsibility for the coastal troops. It was noted at the time that Astapov had experience from participating in the Russian military intervention in the Syrian Civil War. His replacement as chief of staff of the Western Military District was Lieutenant-General .

Awards and personal life
Over his career Astapov has been awarded the Order of Courage, the Order "For Service to the Homeland in the Armed Forces of the USSR" Third Class, and the Order of Military Merit, as well as a number of medals. He is married, with a son.

References

1962 births
Living people
People from Tikhoretsk
Russian lieutenant generals
Russian major generals
Soviet Army officers
Personnel of the Soviet Airborne Forces
Russian Navy personnel
Russian military personnel of the Syrian civil war
Frunze Military Academy alumni
Ryazan Guards Higher Airborne Command School alumni
Military Academy of the General Staff of the Armed Forces of Russia alumni
Recipients of the Order of Military Merit (Russia)
Recipients of the Order of Courage
Recipients of the Order "For Service to the Homeland in the Armed Forces of the USSR", 3rd class
20th-century Russian military personnel
21st-century Russian military personnel